Erica Anderson is a fictional character in the 2011 video game Catherine.

Concept and creation
Erica's features are generally feminine, but her eyes bear resemblance more to male characters'. She exhibits dominant body language as well as body language that demonstrates sexual confidence. Characters in Catherine behave in a sensible fashion towards Erica, directly and indirectly. Characters react with disgust to the idea of one character having sex with her and she is referred to by her deadname at multiple points, both in-universe and in the game's credits. Erica is also subject to nightmares that are said to only affect men.

Appearances
Erica appears in a side mode of Catherine: Full Body as a playable character. A downloadable costume based on Erica was made available in Persona 5 for Haru Okumura, one of its playable characters.

Reception
Since appearing in Catherine, Erica has received mixed to negative reception. Atlus received criticism for Erica's depiction of a trans character, with writer Matt Kim suggesting that her coming out scene was used to embarrass Toby, who had sex with her. Writer Mattie Brice was critical of Erica, calling her an "extremely problematic character." She felt that the hints that exist of her gender, when viewed in hindsight, come off as malicious. She particularly cites characters' aversion to her and disparaging of her femininity. She felt however that her actual character is great and relatable, but the way she is framed in the game "doesn’t provide any optimism for trans-folk and their allies." The Guardians Matt Kamen agreed on the hints, stating that the game "[reflects] the real fears and stigmas trans people face."

Writer Ana Valens was hopeful that Erica might be improved with Full Body, but was disappointed to discover that it was even worse. She cites a scene where Erica does not transition, with an ending that is meant to be an "ideal" world for everyone. She suggests that this implies that not transitioning is better for her. Writer Caty McCarthy felt that Erica came off as well-rounded until her coming out was treated like a joke. Writer Sam Greer agreed that she felt like her status as a trans woman is treated like a joke. GamesRadar's Kimberley Ballard criticized Erica as a "fetish" character. Writer Astrid Johnson felt that Atlus was "hamfisted" with how they wrote Erica and felt that she was oversexualized, but was overall pleased with her character, citing her steadfast and distinct personality. However, she was critical of the fact that she received dreams that only men received, claiming it suggests that she is actually a man. Writer Carol Grant was similarly put off by this plot, also criticizing a line where Toby claims that the sex he had with Erica felt "weird." She suggests that this is a part of a greater problem with Catherine, which she claims features characters who fit gender types, such as one woman being the "nagging shrew" archetype. A Nightmare Mode writer felt that the nightmare plot point was a punishment by the game's antagonist for Erica having sex with Toby, which they compare to real-life violence trans people experience in similar situations.

Japanese audiences received Erica more positively. Other writers were more receptive to Erica. Writer Charlotte Cutts was pleased with her character and personality, but disappointed with Atlus' handling of her trans status. Writer Pixie the Fairy, in an article on Destructoid, was more positive on the character. They noted that the other characters did not choose to out her as transgender, and praised the portrayal for its positive effects on people who are yet to come out. A fellow Destructoid writer, Ben Davis, felt that Erica was handled respectfully, and that while Toby is surprised by this, describes his reaction as joking in a friendly way. Advocate listed Erica in their list of the best LGBT characters in video games. Writer Kazuma Hashimoto discussed Erica in the context of Japanese trans people. He discusses the nightmare plot, showing her in the dream world expressing distress that she cannot birth children. He notes that this comes off as transphobic to global audiences but touches upon a "deeply Japanese" issue with outdated laws which require that trans people undergo gender affirming surgery if they transition. He also discusses a culture that views womanhood as having the ability to give birth. As such, he claims that this harms Erica's ability to be perceived as a woman. He also discusses how her deadnaming may reflect the fact past and present laws that prevent unmarried trans people from changing their names. He discusses how her treatment in-game is reflective of transphobia and sexism in Japanese media, while noting that cultural differences may result in a character being received differently in one country than the other.

References

Atlus characters
Female characters in video games
Fictional transgender women
Fictional waiting staff
LGBT characters in video games
Video game characters introduced in 2011